Colorado is an unincorporated community in Bastrop County, Texas, United States. It is located within the Greater Austin metropolitan area.

History
The community was named after the state of Colorado. A church and several scattered homes marked the community on county maps in the 1940s and it only had a church and cemetery but no homes by the 1980s. It did not have any population estimates in 2000.

Geography

Education
Colorado had its own school in 1905, with one teacher and 50 black students. It is said to have joined the Smithville Independent School District in 1921. The community continues to be served by the Smithville ISD today.

References

Unincorporated communities in Bastrop County, Texas
Unincorporated communities in Texas